The Helderberg Mountain is part of the Hottentots-Holland mountain range in the Western Cape, South Africa. The Helderberg Nature Reserve is situated on the slopes of the beautiful Helderberg Mountain overlooking the town of Somerset West and False Bay. There are numerous hiking trails on the Helderberg mountain.

External links
 http://www.helderbergnaturereserve.co.za/
 http://www.helderbergfarm.co.za/

Mountains of the Western Cape